Marsden Park is a suburb of Sydney, in the state of New South Wales, Australia.

The rapid development of Marsden Park beginning 2013 led to a large increase in the suburb's population. However, slow creation of adequate infrastructure and services such as shops, schools, roads, public transport and healthcare to match the increased houses and rising population, has led Marsden Park to be seen as a prime example of urban sprawl within the outskirts of Sydney.

The suburb name should not be confused with the park and surrounding housing estate with the same name Marsden Park, also known as 'Park Central' located in Campbelltown, in the Campbelltown local government area part of both the Macarthur region and South Western Sydney.

History
The suburbs takes its name from Samuel Marsden (1764–1838), a Church of England priest and landowner in the area.

The suburb boundaries of Schofields were changed in November 2020, resulting in the creation of new suburbs of Melonba and Angus in the west and north respectively.

Heritage listings 
Marsden Park has a number of heritage-listed sites, including:
 1270 Richmond Road: Clydesdale

Schools
 Marsden Park Public School, established in 1889.
 Australian Christian College, Marsden Park campus.
 St Luke's Catholic College (K-12), established in 2017.
 Northbourne Public school, established in 2021.

Places of worship
 Baitul Huda Mosque is located on Hollinsworth Road.

Amenities
The suburb includes a caravan park, a golf driving range, a Hamrun Maltese Club and a chicken farm. The suburb is currently being developed with new residential and commercial areas. Sydney Business Park is a new commercial precinct in the suburb, adjacent to the Westlink M7 Motorway. The site includes an IKEA store, Costco warehouse with Costco Fuel Station, Bunnings Warehouse, a Woolies and Aldi supermarket, a Lindt Factory Outlet, a Dulux paint store, a Home Hub centre, a Home Consortium centre with Rebel Sport, Bing Lee. Commercial businesses include a Toll Group, TigerPak and Linfox logistics centre plus a Swire Cold Storage. Rent a Space Self Storage will be opening a new self storage facility in Ultimo Place in December 2020.There is also a Shell petrol station with a Coles Express and a 7/11 convenience store here. It formerly had Toys "R" Us and Babies "R" Us and a Salvation Army and cafe.

Local cafes and fast-food restaurants: 24-hour McDonald's, Domino's, KFC, Boost Juice, Starbucks, Zambrero, The Barista Shed, Choice Sushi, Paradise Charcoal Chicken, Pizza Hut, Oporto.

References

External links
Revised suburb boundary of Marsden Park (November 2020) – Blacktown City Council

Suburbs of Sydney
City of Blacktown